The Mecar M72 is a fragmentation hand grenade used by the Belgian military.
It was designed by Belgian company PRB, with Mecar taking over production after PRB closed.  Made by PRB it was known both as the PRB 423 and the M72.

The M72 grenade has an egg shaped body fitted with an internal notched steel wire fragmentation coil. The grenade weighs  in total, with an explosive load of  Composition B. Its fuze delays detonation 4 seconds after the spoon is released. The top of the body around the fuse thread was filled with 33 0.1 g metal ball bearings and a further 22 are placed inside the bottom closing plug. 

An untrained soldier could normally throw the grenade , making it safe to use as on offensive grenade, as well as a defensive grenade.

A re-usable practice grenade was made with a solid Aluminium body.  Known as the M73, the grenade body vented gases from a 13mm hole running from the fuse carrier thread to the bottom of the grenade. This grenade uses a four second delay fuse identical in all respects to the M72 fuse except the detonator has been replaced by a deflagrator, which produces noise and smoke.  A very similar drill practice grenade was made than had a 9 mm through hole.  This would only mount the M73A1 Practice fuze (with no charge for drill purposes) The deflagrator fuse is too large to fit the drill grenade, but either drill fuse or deflagrator fuse will fit the practice grenade.

PRB made a similar Offensive grenade known as the PRB 446.  It did not have the fragmentation coil or ball bearings but carried a greater explosive load ( grams of cast TNT). It was externally the same as the PRB 423 apart from the brown body colour and the different identification marks printed on the grenade.

References
 M72 at Milpedia 

Mecar
Grenades of Belgium